DuPage may refer to:
 DuPage County, Illinois
 DuPage Township, Will County, Illinois
 DuPage River
 DuPage Airport
 College of DuPage
 USS DuPage